Someone to Talk To is a 2016 Chinese drama film directed by Liu Yulin, a Tisch School of the Arts student and a silver medalist at the 41st Student Academy Awards, in her feature film directorial debut.

Liu Zhenyun, Liu Yulin's father, wrote the screenplay based on his award-winning novel, One Sentence Is Ten Thousand Sentences.

Plot
Cobbler Niu Aiguo is in conflict with his wife, while his older sister, street food vender Niu Aixiang, considers marriage later in life. Both desperately want to communicate with someone, though their own situations are at opposite poles. Aiguo then breaks up with his wife and Aixiang marries divorcée Song Jiefang. Aiguo runs into his childhood friend Chuhong while searching for his wife and falls into conversation with her. It turns out that she is also divorced as a result of communication failure and it seems Aixiang and Jiefang can’t get along either.

Cast
Mao Hai as Niu Aiguo
Li Qian as Pang Lina
Liu Bei as Niu Aixiang
Fan Wei as Song Jiefang
Yu Entai as Jiang
Qi Xi as Xinting
Sun Qian as Chuhong
Li Nuonuo as Baihui

Release
The movie had its world premiere at the New Currents section at the 21st Busan International Film Festival in October 2016. It was subsequently released in theaters in Mainland China, the United Kingdom, New Zealand, and the United States in November 2016. It has also been selected for more than 50 film festivals around the world, including, but not limited to, the New York Asian Film Festival, Cairo International Film Festival, Hong Kong Asian Film Festival, and XI’AN Silk Road International Film Festival.

Reception
Elizabeth Kerr of The Hollywood Reporter wrote that despite "a few missteps, Liu’s first effort is an assured examination of the world right now, and proves she’s one to watch."

Accolades

References

External links

Films with screenplays by Liu Zhenyun
2016 directorial debut films
Films based on Chinese novels
Films set in Shanxi
Films set in Henan
Films shot in Henan
Chinese drama films